Zanskari may refer to:

 the people of Zanskar, a tehsil of Kargil district, Jammu and Kashmir, India
 the Zaniskari pony, a breed of pony found around Leh and Laddakh, Jammu and Kashmir, India
 Zangskari language, the language of most of the people of Zanskar which is, apparently, closely related to Ladhaki.